Vigra is a former municipality in Møre og Romsdal county on the west coast of Norway. The  municipality existed from 1890 until its dissolution in 1964 when it was merged into the present-day Giske Municipality. The former municipality was made up of the island of Vigra along with many smaller islets surrounding it. The administrative centre of the municipality was the village of Roald, and Vigra Church was the main church for the municipality.

Also, Vigra a meteorology term which is precipitation from a cloud that never reaches the surface.

History
On 1 January 1890, the western islands in Haram Municipality were separated from Haram and established as Roald Municipality.  The initial population was 794.  In 1911, the name of the municipality was changed to Vigra.  During the 1960s, there were many municipal mergers across Norway due to the work of the Schei Committee. On 1 January 1964, the whole municipality of Vigra was merged into the neighboring Giske Municipality. Prior to the merger, the population of the municipality was 1,569. In 1988, five nature reserves were established on the island, including the Blindheimsvik Wildlife Sanctuary.

Name
The municipality was named after the main island of Vigra.  The island's name comes from the Old Norse word vigr which means "spear". It is likely that a peninsula of the island was being compared to the shape of a spear blade.

Government
All municipalities in Norway, including Vigra, are responsible for primary education (through 10th grade), outpatient health services, senior citizen services, unemployment and other social services, zoning, economic development, and municipal roads.  The municipality is governed by a municipal council of elected representatives, which in turn elects a mayor.

Municipal council
The municipal council  of Vigra was made up of 13 representatives that were elected to four year terms.  The party breakdown of the final municipal council was as follows:

See also
List of former municipalities of Norway

References

Giske
Former municipalities of Norway
1890 establishments in Norway
1964 disestablishments in Norway